Train World is a railway museum in Brussels, Belgium, and the official museum of the National Railway Company of Belgium (NMBS/SNCB). It is situated in the preserved buildings of Schaarbeek railway station and in a new shed built to its north. Although scheduled to open in 2014, its opening was delayed until September 2015, when it was solemnly opened by King Philippe.

Overview
It also displays 1,200 other objects, including an original 19th century railway bridge. One of the most important objects in the museum is the "Pays du Waes" locomotive, dating to 1845, which is the oldest preserved locomotive in continental Europe.

Collection

The preserved railway materials which are exhibited in the national museum in Schaarbeek (Brussels) 

The following materials are on display (definitively) in the National Museum in Schaerbeek (Brussels) :

In addition, a set of steam and diesel locomotives, railcars, electric railcars, coaches and wagons are managed by the 4 Belgian railway associations : The PFT, the CFV3V, the SME and SDP.

 The "Juliette" steam crane (A310.4 with shock wagon n°40 88 958 4800-5). Built by "Craven Brothers" in Manchester (England) in 1912. 17m, 80T, maximum speed : 35km/h. Lifting capacity: 35T. First used by the "British Army Forces" (England). Then received by the SNCB in 1947, it was used at the Kinkempois depot (in Liège). Decommissioned in 1987.
 A Belpaire hearth boiler from a type 25 steam locomotive (ex-Belgian State Railways). 46T (locomotive only). Built by Cockerill (or by Forges Usines et Fonderies Haine-Saint-Pierre) in 1884 (number unknown). Then transformed into a steam generator.
 The steam locomotive Le Belge (real size wooden replica). The original was built by Cockerill (in Liège) in 1835 and carried the number 6 (formerly Belgian State Railways). 5.4m, 11.6T, maximum speed : 60km/h. Decommissioned in 1869.
 The steam locomotive "L'Eléphant" (full size wooden replica). The original was built by "Tayleur" (England) in 1835, 14T. Decommissioned in 1847.
 The steam locomotive Pays de Waes (n°2). Built by the "Ateliers Gustave De Ridder" (in Brussels) in 1844. 12m, 17.5T, maximum speed: 60km/h. This locomotive has a gauge of 1,150m (instead of the current 1,435m). It was used by the Antwerp Railway Company in Ghent until it was decommissioned in 1898. It was then exhibited at the 1913 Universal Exhibition in Ghent. It was also exhibited in England for the celebrations of the 100th anniversary of the railways in 1925. It was then exhibited in the former "Musée de la gare de Bruxelles-Nord" (in Brussels) in 1951. It is the oldest steam locomotive kept by the SNCB.
 The shunting steam locomotive (030T) Type 51 steam locomotive 1152. Built by Anglo-Franco-Belge (in La Croyère) in 1880 (formerly Belgian State Railways No. 1152).  8m, 34T, maximum speed: 45km/h. Capacity of the coal bunker: 1.3T. Water tank capacity: 4,000L (4m³). In 1929 it was sold to the "Carbochimie Centrale de Tertre".  Decommissioned in 1967. Nickname for this type of locomotive: "La Chèvre" (because of its hearth which can burn all kinds of coal).
 The heavy express steam locomotive State Railways Type 10 steam locomotive 10.018 (Type 10) and its tender No. 31.031 (Type 38). Built by Cockerill (in Liège) in 1913 (ex Belgian State Railways No. 4518). 22m, 176T (locomotive & tender), maximum speed: 120km/h. Capacity of the coal bunker (tender): 7T. Capacity of the water tank (tender): 31,000L (31m³). This locomotive ensured the last route (in steam traction) from Luxembourg City to Brussels on September 29, 1956. Decommissioned in 1959.
 The light express steam locomotive Type 12 steam locomotive 12.004 (Type 12) and its tender No. 24.604 (Type 19). Built by Cockerill (in Liège) in 1939. 21m, 148T (locomotive & tender), maximum speed: 140km/h. Capacity of the coal bunker (tender): 8T.  Capacity of the water tank (tender): 24,000L (24m³). Decommissioned in 1962. It is the only one preserved (inextremis) of its type out of the 6 built (12.001-12.006). This streamlined steam locomotive is the centerpiece of the museum.
 The steam locomotive for direct, express and suburban trains (of English inspiration) 18.051 (Type 18) and its tender n°18.020 (Type 14). Built by the Saint-Léonard company (in Liège) in 1905 (formerly Belgian State Railways No. 3251). 18m, 105T (locomotive & tender), maximum speed: 110km/h. Capacity of the coal bunker (tender): 5.4T. Capacity of the water tank (tender): 18,000L (18m³). Decommissioned in 1948. In 1966, it was painted in a "violet blue" in order to underline its Scottish origin and to pay homage to the "Caledonian Railway". Then repainted in a "chocolate brown" livery which was originally delivered at the time of the Belgian State Railways (before 1930).
 The industrial steam locomotive (020T) "MF33". Built by Forges Usines et Fonderies Haine-Saint-Pierre in 1911 (n°1204), 25T. She belonged to the Charbonnage de Monceau Fontaine where she worked on the former private connection of the coal mine. From 1976, this locomotive belonged to CFV3V asbl (based in Mariembourg). It was then transferred to the museum in 2013 for its final exhibition in the museum's "playground".
 A Draisine (with hands) for the transport of people and equipment. Built in Germany in 1905. It was abandoned in 1918 by the German railways. Subsequently, it was still used until 1963 by the team of track layers in Boom on line 52 (between Antwerp-Puurs). Maximum speed: 30km/h.
 A type 7 inspection car (n°701) n°380.25.701.60: Built by "Perkins" in 1949. 7m, 15T, maximum speed: 70km/h. Diesel tank capacity: 225L. Former draisines (or Lorry) for inspecting railway tracks but also for transporting workers and materials required for track maintenance.
 The diesel railcar for secondary lines 551.48 (ex. type 622 called "petit Brossel"). Built by "L'Atelier Central de Malines" and by Brossel (in Brussels) in 1939. 11m, 22T. 86 seats in total (76 seats + 10 folding seats).  Decommissioned in 1962.
 The line diesel locomotive (prototype) 6406 (211.006) (Type 211 - Axle arrangement: two bogies with 2 driving axles called Bo'Bo'). Built by the Ateliers Belges Réunis (in Enghien) in 1962. 17.5m, 82T, maximum speed: 120km/h. Diesel tank capacity: 3,000L (3m³). Decommissioned in 1983. This locomotive lost its engine.
 The electric locomotive (polyvoltage 3,000/25,000kV) Class 15 electric locomotive 1503 (150.003) (Type 150 - Arrangement of the axles: two bogies with 2 driving axles called Bo'Bo'). Built by La Brugeoise and Nivelles/ACEC in 1962. 17m, 77T, maximum speed: 160km/h.  Decommissioned in 2009.
 An end car of the first 00 series electric multiple unit (Type 1935) Automotrice AM 35 (pilot car no. 217.012). (Single voltage 3,000kV - 4 elements in total - Arrangement of axles: B-B + 2-2 + 2-2 + B-B). Built by the Nivelles Metallurgical Workshops in 1935. 22m for the end car (91m & 277T for the 4 cars). Maximum speed: 120 km/h.  353 seats in total (116 in 1st and 237 in 2nd class). Decommissioned in 1964. The 3 other elements of this railcar are parked in the reserves (n°215.212 + n°212.212 + n°213.012).
 A passenger car type GCI* n°91.001 (*Large Intercirculation Capacity) 1st/2nd class (+ van). Built by Compagnie Centrale de Construction (in Haine-Saint-Pierre) in 1921. 15m, 36T, maximum speed: 80km/h, 64 seats. Decommissioned in 1960.
 A passenger car type M1* n°63.105 (*metal car) 3rd class. Built by Anglo-Franco-Belge (in La Croyère) in 1937 (under the old number 42.087). 22m, 55T, maximum speed: 120km/h.  94 seats. The interior is partly configured as a "hospital car" (Belgian Red Cross infirmary).
 A "TEE" type passenger car (Trans Europ Express) Mistral II - A8tu - n°135 (1st class). Built by "Franco-Rail" (France) in 1974. 25.5m, 44T, maximum speed: 160km/h.  46 seats. Decommissioned in 1997.
 A post car of German origin n°70.803. Built by "Wagenfabrik Credé & Co" in Kassel-Niederzwehren (Germany) in 1930 for the "Deutsche Reichpost". 21m, 44T, maximum speed: 120km/h. Abandoned in Belgium after the Second World War, it was used as a sorting district between 1945 and 1981.
 Restaurant car n°16.006 (Type I10 SNCB). Built by "La Brugeoise and Nivelles" in 1988. 26m, 42T, maximum speed: 160km/h. This car was originally a 2nd class car (n°12.776). In 2000, it was transformed into a restaurant car under the number 16.006. It was decommissioned in 2015 and integrated into the SNCB collections. It was placed in September of the same year on a section of rail where it serves as space for workshops in a "Pullman" livery of the CIWL (from a historical point of view, this livery has never existed on  this type of car).
 Two cars from the Belgian royal trains: (one from the train of Leopold II and Albert I and one from the train of Leopold III and Baudouin I):
 The car A2 (A1) "Royal sedan" (Salon/beds). Built by the General Construction Company (subsidiary of the Compagnie Internationale des Wagons-Lits) in Saint-Denis (France) in 1901, 19m, 45T. It is equipped with a luxurious private lounge, a sleeping compartment with a bathroom for the king, four sleeping compartments, a service room and another for heating. It has been on display at the museum since it opened in September 2015.
 The car n°1 "Salon". This is an old type I1 (SNCB) car (number unknown) transformed by "L'Atelier Central de Mechelen" in 1939. 23m, 61T, maximum speed: 150km/h. It is equipped with an entrance hall, an office with a stove + fridge and a sink, a small living room, a large living room with 6 armchairs and 3 small tables and two toilets. It has been on display at the museum since it opened in September 2015.
 A 2-axle "covered" type freight wagon No. 8938 of the Belgian State Railways. Built by the Ateliers de Seneffe in 1899. 7m, 9T. It was used for carriage transport.
 A 2-axle "tank" type freight car No. 91578 of the Belgian State Railways. Built in 1901, 8m.  It was used to transport oil.
 A 2-axle "covered" type goods car No. 948/287. Built in 1911 (ex-German), 9m, 16T. Deportation wagon.

The Treignes railway museum also holds part of the "SNCB" collection, the material is as follows 

 The Type 1 steam locomotive (1.002).
 The Type 7 steam locomotive (7.039).
 The Type 16 steam locomotive (16.042).
 The Type 53 shunting steam locomotive (5620).
 Railcar 608.05.
 The diesel shunting locomotive 8319.
 The electric locomotive 2005.
 The electric locomotive 2912 (101.012).
 The carriage for the royal children of the Léopold 3 and Baudouin 1er train (carriage n°4).
 One inspection car n°10.

The following materials are stored in the reserves (waiting or being restored) 

 The steam locomotive  (41.195).
 The steam locomotive  (44.225).
 The steam locomotive type 64 (64.045).
 Railcar 4505.
 Railcar 4006.
 The diesel shunting locomotive 7209.
 The diesel shunting locomotive 8219.
 The diesel shunting locomotive 8441.
 The diesel shunting locomotive 9152.
 Line diesel locomotive 5142.
 Line diesel locomotive 5917.
 Line diesel locomotive 6305.
 Line diesel locomotive 6306.
 The electric locomotive 1187.
 The electric locomotive (polyvoltage) 1602.
 The electric locomotive 2001.
 The electric locomotive 2383.
 The electric locomotive 2711.
 The 002 séries electric multiple unit (ex AM Post).
 The 002 séries electric multiple unit.
 The 039 séries electric multiple unit.
 The 600 séries electric multiple unit (n°600 ex AM "Sabena").
 The 800 séries electric multiple unit (n°810 known as "Nez de Cochons").
 a British Rail Class 373 in Eurostar livery.

The coaches 

 5 coaches type GCI passenger car (ex-SNCB).
 5 coaches type K1 passenger car (ex-SNCB).
 8 coaches type L passenger car (ex-SNCB).
 8 coaches type M2 passenger car (ex-SNCB).
 3 coaches type M4 passenger car (ex-SNCB).
 1 coaches type I1 passenger car (ex-SNCB).
 1 coaches type I2 passenger car (ex-SNCB).
 1 coaches type I5 passenger car (ex-SNCB).

Special cars, vans and freight wagons 

 1 "Cinema" car.

Preserved railway materials that have been sold and exhibited outside museums (in Belgium and abroad) 

The following materials have been transferred to municipalities, towns or various institutions in Belgium (or abroad) and which are visible to the public :

 The locomotive without boiler (080T) 5265 (No. 12). Built by the "Ateliers Métallurgiques de La Meuse" (in Liège) in 1954, 57T. It was used by the "Charbonnage de Beringen" until 1970. Then used by the Stella Artois factory in Louvain for transport between the factory and the SNCB marshalling yard. Decommissioned and transferred to SNCB in 1976. Offered to the city of Louvain and transferred to the "rue des locomotives" (in a former industrial building) in 2013.
 The industrial steam locomotive (Type 080T) n°4 called "La Hestre". Built by the "Grosses Forges et Usines de la Herstre" in 1923, 7m. It was used by the "S.A des Cokeries de Willebroek". Acquired by the SNCB in 1970. This locomotive was placed as a "Monument - Flowerpot" on a former railway bridge over the Charleroi-Brussels Canal near Tour et Taxis (in Brussels).
 The industrial steam locomotive (Type 040T) with vertical boiler n°2435 (Type IV) n°2. Built by Cockerill (in Liège) in 1903, 4m. It was used by the "S.A des Cokeries de Willebroek". Acquired by the SNCB in 1970. This locomotive has been placed as a "Monument - Flowerpot" on the site of the "Klingspoor" in Sint-Gillis-Waas (in Flanders).
 Freight car (closed) No. 316 423. Built in 1908 in Germany. Decommissioned in 1986, 9m. This wagon was placed as a "Monument - Flowerpot" on the site of the "Klingspoor" in Sint-Gillis-Waas (in Flanders).
 Belgian State Railways 2-axle "tank" type freight car No. 91563. Built by Ateliers Germain (in Monceau-sur-Sambre) in 1901. 8m, 10T. It was used to transport oil.  This wagon was placed as a "Monument - Flowerpot" on a former railway bridge over the Charleroi-Brussels Canal near Tour et Taxis (in Brussels).
 Belgian State Railways freight car (closed) No. 153597. Built by Anglo-Franco-Belge (at La Croyère) in 1911, 8m. This Deportation wagon can be seen at the Dossin military barracks.
 Railcar trailer n°732.08 (Type 732 - RAW C6). Built by "L'Atelier de Nivelles" in 1954. 12m, 14T, maximum speed: 90km/h. 65 seats in total (58 seated + 7 standing) in 2nd class. Bought by a private side of Stoumont.
 A "RIC" type van (short type) : n°17.104 (ex n°14.158). 15m, 37T, maximum speed: 140km/h. Built by the "Compagnie Centrale de Construction" (in Haine-Saint-Pierre) in 1938. Decommissioned in 1996. This van wears a green livery. Bought by a private side of Tervueren.
 The "BENELUX" electric railcar of the 09 series (Type 1957 - AM57 - Mat'57) (n°220.902 & n°220.903 or 902 & 903 - ex AM "BENELUX") (Bi-voltage 1,500/3,000kV - 2  elements - Axle arrangement: Bo'2' + Bo'2') 1st/2nd class. Built by "Werkspoor" in Amsterdam (Netherlands) in 1957. 50m, 132T, maximum speed: 130km/h (1000 hp). 135 seats in total (27 in 1st and 108 in 2nd class). Withdrawn from service in 1987. This railcar was sold and transferred to the association "Stiching Hondekop" (in Roosendaal in the Netherlands) under the number 902 in 2017. Undergoing complete restoration by this non-profit association. This self-propelled car is in blue livery with a yellow line.

Preserved railway equipment that is in working order or in the process of being restored 

The following equipment is in working order or being restored :

 The line steam locomotive Type 29 (29.013) and its tender n°25.217 (Type 25). Built by "Montreal Locomotive Works" (Canada) in 1946. 20m, 149T (locomotive & tender), maximum speed: 96km/h (2000 hp). Capacity of the coal bunker (tender): 10T. Capacity of the water tank (tender): 25,000L (25m³). It was this locomotive that made the last SNCB steam traction journey on 20/12/1966 between Ath and Denderleeuw (omnibus no. 8155) with a trainset of 5 type M2 passenger cars. Decommissioned in 1967. Undergoing complete restoration (with the installation of the modern TBL1+ security system) since the end of 2019. It will be operational again for 2023 in order to carry out tourist routes on the SNCB in departure from the national museum (in Schaerbeek).
 The line diesel locomotive 5166 (200.066) (Type 200 - Axle arrangement : two bogies with 3 driving axles called Co'Co'). Built by "Cockerill" (in Liège) - ACEC in 1963. 20m, 113T, maximum speed: 120km/h. Diesel fuel tank capacity: 4,000L (4m³). Decommissioned in 2003. Operational in 2022 but not equipped with modern safety systems (TBL1+ or ETCS).
 The line diesel locomotive 5404 (204.004) (Type 204 - Axle arrangement : two bogies with 3 driving axles called Co'Co'). Built by "Anglo-Franco-Belge" (in La Croyère) in 1957. 19m, 108T, maximum speed: between 120-140km/h. Diesel tank capacity: 3,500L (3.5m³). Decommissioned in 1999. Out of service following engine damage since mid-August 2022. Undergoing complete restoration (with the installation of the modern ETCS safety system). It will (normally) be operational again for 2023.
 The line diesel locomotive 5512 (205.012) (Type 205 - Axle arrangement : two bogies with 3 driving axles called Co'Co'). Built by La "Brugeoise and Nivelles" in 1962. 19m, 110T, maximum speed: 120km/h.  Diesel fuel tank capacity: 4,000L (4m³). Former emergency locomotive for TGVs in distress on Belgian LGVs (TVM). Decommissioned in 2021. Taken over by the museum in 2022. It will soon be repainted (in an unknown livery for the moment). Operational in 2022 and is equipped with the modern TBL1+ security system.
 The line diesel locomotive 5910 (201.010) (Type 201 - Axle arrangement : two bogies with 2 driving axles called Bo'Bo'). Built by "Cockerill" (in Liège) in 1955. 16m, 87T, maximum speed: 120km/h. Diesel fuel tank capacity: 4,000L (4m³). Decommissioned in 1989/90. Undergoing full restoration (and installation of modern TBL1+ security system) in 2022.
 The line diesel locomotive 6041 (210.041) (Type 210 - Axle arrangement : two bogies with 2 driving axles called Bo'Bo'). Built by the "Ateliers Belges Réunis" (or Cockerill) in 1963/64. 17m, 78T, maximum speed: 120km/h. Diesel tank capacity: 3,000L (3m³). Decommissioned in 1986. Operational in 2022 but not equipped with modern safety systems (TBL1+ or ETCS).

See also
 History of rail transport in Belgium

References

Notes

Further reading

External links

National railway museums
Railway museums in Belgium
Schaerbeek
Museums in Brussels